"Frantic" is the second single and opening track from American heavy metal band Metallica's 2003 album St. Anger.

Content
This song, like many others on St. Anger, is about the band's past struggles with addictions, particularly lead singer James Hetfield's alcohol problem, for which he spent many months in rehab. The lyrics also  draw on Zen axioms, most notably the Buddhist concept of dukkha brought up by Kirk Hammett: "Birth is pain. Life is pain. Death is pain. It's All The Same."

Music video
A music video, directed by Wayne Isham, was made to go along with Frantic's release as a single. The video, featuring a shortened version of the song, depicts a man looking back on his life (in which he is constantly drinking, having sex, and smoking) at the instant that he crashes his rotisserie delivery pickup truck into an RV at an intersection. Intercut with those clips are scenes of the band performing the song in front of a pile of scrap metal (Hetfield and Hammett) and a set of rocks (Ulrich and Trujillo). At the end of the video, although the man's truck is upside-down, he finds himself still alive and laughs loudly until a car crashes into the side of the truck, tipping it over and presumably killing him. The video was shot in Montreal, Canada.

Track listing

Chart positions

References

2003 singles
Metallica songs
Songs written by James Hetfield
Songs written by Lars Ulrich
Songs written by Kirk Hammett
Songs written by Bob Rock
Music videos directed by Wayne Isham
2003 songs
Elektra Records singles
Song recordings produced by Bob Rock